Dimakos is a Greek surname. Notable people with the surname include:

Dini Dimakos, Canadian comedian
Eleonora Dimakos, Canadian model, actress, journalist, and makeup artist
Germanos Dimakos (1912–2004), Greek Eastern Orthodox priest and Greek Resistance member
Ioannis Dimakos (born 1990), Greek basketball player

Greek-language surnames
Surnames